Brunner is a community in the Township of Perth East, Perth County, Ontario, Canada. The Stratford and Huron Railway, later part of Canadian National Railway, passes through the community.

References

Communities in Perth County, Ontario